Great Pretender is a 2020 original anime television series produced by Wit Studio, directed by Hiro Kaburagi, written by Ryōta Kosawa, character designs by Yoshiyuki Sadamoto and music composed by Yutaka Yamada. Yamada also composes its theme song "G.P.", while its ending theme is a cover of the song "The Great Pretender" performed by Queen lead vocalist Freddie Mercury, originally recorded by The Platters.

The series' story is divided into blocks of episodes called "Cases". Case 1: Los Angeles Connection is episodes 1 through 5, Case 2: Singapore Sky is episodes 6 through 10, Case 3: Snow of London is episodes 11 through 14, and Case 4: Wizard of Far East is episodes 15 through 23. Case 1 began streaming on Netflix Japan on June 2, 2020, with Case 2 following on June 9. Case 3 began streaming on Netflix Japan on June 16, 2020, and Case 4 followed on September 21. Outside of Japan, Netflix released the first "season", comprising Cases 1-3, on August 20, 2020 and the remaining Case 4 on November 25, 2020. Great Pretender's first 14 episodes were released outside of Japan on Netflix on August 20, 2020, with the last 9 following on November 25.

The anime series aired on Fuji TV's +Ultra anime programming block and BS Fuji from July 8 to December 16, 2020.

Episode list

Notes

References

Great Pretender
2020 television episodes